Spin Up is an iOS game developed by Nenad Katic  and released on March 28, 2012.

Critical reception
The game has a rating on Metacritic of 89% based on 5 critic reviews.

SlideToPlay said " Spin Up is one of the most creative high-score games we've ever played. " Gamezebo said " Spin Up takes that standard formula and adds in a unique take and control scheme, making the entire concept feel totally fresh once again. " AppSafari wrote "An iPad game that combines the foresight of chess with quick, agile gesture control in a constantly changing tunnelscape. " 148Apps said " Spin Up is a great game for fans of the genre. As with most high-score based games repetition eventually sets in, but trying to earn enough experience points for new characters should keep the player busy for a good while. " Multiplayer.it said " Being a score-based arcade, Spin Up is best suited for ranking-addicted players, but it's also an original and challenging game which everyone can enjoy. "

References

2012 video games
IOS games
Arcade video games